Millry is a town in Washington County, Alabama, United States. According to the 1950 U.S. Census records, it incorporated in 1947. The population was 546 at the 2010 census, down from 615 in 2000.

Geography
Millry is located at  (31.631309, -88.318972).

Demographics

As of the census of 2000, there were 615 people, 262 households, and 175 families residing in the town. The racial makeup of the town was 63.41% White, 35.45% Black or African American, 0.81% Native American, and 0.33% from two or more races. 0.65% of the population were Hispanic or Latino of any race.

There were 262 households, out of which 27.1% had children under the age of 18 living with them, 51.1% were married couples living together, 13.4% had a female householder with no husband present, and 33.2% were non-families. 30.9% of all households were made up of individuals, and 15.6% had someone living alone who was 65 years of age or older. The average household size was 2.35 and the average family size was 2.93.

In the town, the population was spread out, with 22.6% under the age of 18, 9.3% from 18 to 24, 23.1% from 25 to 44, 28.0% from 45 to 64, and 17.1% who were 65 years of age or older. The median age was 42 years. For every 100 females, there were 89.2 males. For every 100 females age 18 and over, there were 83.1 males.

The median income for a household in the town was $24,886, and the median income for a family was $32,500. Males had a median income of $36,667 versus $17,917 for females. The per capita income for the town was $14,782. About 17.7% of families and 21.2% of the population were below the poverty line, including 21.1% of those under age 18 and 29.2% of those age 65 or over.

References

Towns in Alabama
Towns in Washington County, Alabama